Gahnia drummondii is a tussock-forming perennial in the family Cyperaceae, that is native to south western parts of Western Australia.

References

drummondii
Plants described in 1980
Flora of Western Australia
Taxa named by Karen Louise Wilson